PeaceHealth Sacred Heart Medical Center at RiverBend is a 388-bed regional medical center. The hospital is located in Springfield, in the U.S. state of Oregon.  Established in 2008, it is one of two Sacred Heart facilities in the Eugene-Springfield area owned by PeaceHealth.  The new RiverBend facility is home to a 24-hour Level II trauma center including full medical/surgical care. The hospital also provides full women's and children's services, including labor and delivery, and a Neonatal Intensive Care Unit. Oregon Heart and Vascular Institute is located within the facility, as is the Oregon Neurosciences Institute. With the addition of two pediatric surgeons since 2013, RiverBend is now the only hospital outside of the Portland area to offer pediatric surgery.

RiverBend Pavilion
RiverBend Pavilion is an onsite location for non-hospital related services. 
These include:
Urgent Care - no longer at this location as of summer 2015, now located at 860 Beltline, Springfield 
Pediatrics
PeaceHealth Laboratories
Oregon Imaging Center
Gastroenterology
Endoscopy
Neurology
Oregon Bariatric Center

Opened in August, 2008, the facility replaced Sacred Heart University District as the largest in the area.

See also
 List of hospitals in Oregon
 Sacred Heart Medical Center University District, a nearby hospital located in Eugene that is also owned by PeaceHealth

References

External links

 PeaceHealth Sacred Heart Medical Center at RiverBend
 PeaceHealth

2008 establishments in Oregon
Buildings and structures in Lane County, Oregon
Hospital buildings completed in 2008
Hospitals established in 2008
Hospitals in Oregon
Springfield, Oregon